Richard A. Lobban, Jr., husband of Dr. Carolyn Fluehr-Lobban, is an anthropologist and early pioneer in social network modeling, archaeologist, Egyptologist, Sudanist, foreign policy expert, human rights activist, mentor, father, and beekeeper.  He is Professor Emeritus of Anthropology and African Studies at Rhode Island College, Providence, Rhode Island since 1972; also a lecturer at the Archaeological Institute of America and the Naval War College. He is an expert in Ancient Sudan and Ancient Egypt, with a particular focus on Nubia.  He is a co-founder of the Sudan Studies Association.

Books

Lobban has also authored numerous books and publications such as the Historical Dictionary of Ancient and Medieval Nubia, Historical Dictionary of Sudan (2002), and Social Networks in Urban Sudan (1973). He has also authored/co-authored books such as Historical dictionary of the Republic of Guinea-Bissau (1997), Cape Verde: Crioulo colony to independent nation (1995), Historical dictionary of Cape Verde (2007), and Middle Eastern women and the invisible economy (1998).

References

American anthropologists
American archaeologists
American Egyptologists
Living people
Rhode Island College faculty
1943 births